Czarnówko  (German Scharnhorst, Kashubian Czôrnòwkò) is a village in the administrative district of Gmina Nowa Wieś Lęborska, within Lębork County, Pomeranian Voivodeship, in northern Poland. The settlement of Kanin (German: Schlüsselberg, Kashubian: Kôninò) with 50 inhabitants is also part of Czarnówko.

An Iron Age grave of the Wielbark culture was discovered in Czarnówko in 2000. contained a bronze Westland cauldron depicting men with Suebi knots.

For details of the history of the region, see History of Pomerania.

The village has a population of 192.

References

Villages in Lębork County